The Newcastle Ocean Baths are a sea bath in Newcastle, New South Wales. The site includes pavilions, pools and promenades. The baths are known for architectural features such as the Striped Classical / Art Deco facade and bleacher seating.

History 
Construction of the Newcastle Ocean Baths began in 1910 and they were in use before World War I. However, they were not formally opened until the 1920s. Construction of the pavilion began in 1922.

References

Newcastle, New South Wales